Lieut. Commander Francis John Hamilton Scott Napier (20 December 1850 – 18 November 1929) was a Royal Navy officer and British philatelist who signed the Roll of Distinguished Philatelists in 1921.

Publications
South Australia. London: Stanley Gibbons, 1894. (With Gordon Smith)
Portuguese India, with Gilbert Harrison.  Stanley Gibbons Ltd, Philatelic Handbook No. 1. (1893).  Reprinted, 1998.

References

External links
 Free eBook of Smith & Napier's South Australia.

British philatelists
1850 births
1929 deaths
Signatories to the Roll of Distinguished Philatelists
Royal Navy officers